Aborichthys cataracta is a species of stone loach endemic to streams joining Ranga River in Upper Subanshri District, India. This fish grows to a length of  SL.

References

Nemacheilidae
Fish of Asia
Freshwater fish of India
Taxa named by Muthukumarasamy Arunachalam
Taxa named by Manickam Raja
Taxa named by Punniyam Malaiammal
Taxa named by Richard L. Mayden
Fish described in 2014